Firefly Alpha (Firefly α) is a two-stage orbital expendable launch vehicle developed by the American company Firefly Aerospace to compete in the commercial small satellite launch market. Alpha is intended to provide launch options for both full vehicle and rideshare customers.

The first launch attempt was on 3 September 2021 but the vehicle did not reach orbit when one of the first stage engines failed during ascent. A second orbital test flight took place on 1 October 2022 and successfully reached orbit. Alpha deployed 7 satellites, however, due to the lower than intended deployment orbit, most of the satellites re-entered before reaching their intended design life a week after launch.

History 
The initial 2014-vintage design of Alpha was two-stage-to-orbit vehicle with the first stage powered by an FRE-2 methalox engine, which consisted of twelve nozzles arranged in an aerospike configuration. The engine used methane and liquid oxygen as propellants, and completed a full-duration combustor test in September 2016. The second stage was to be propelled by the FRE-1 engine, which was to use a conventional bell nozzle. This version of Alpha was intended to carry 400 kg to low Earth orbit.

In 2015, NASA's Launch Services Program awarded Firefly Space Systems, the predecessor to Firefly Aerospace, a US$5.5 million Venture Class Launch Services contract to incentivize the development of Alpha, as part of a program to enable easier space access for the small satellite market.

After the March 2017 bankruptcy of Firefly Space Systems and corporate reorganization to become Firefly Aerospace with new owners and capital, the Alpha launch vehicle was redesigned to a much larger rocket, over twice as much capacity as the Alpha design of 2014. The main body of the rocket is constructed using a lightweight carbon composite material.

In March 2018, Firefly said that the development of Alpha was expected to cost approximately US$100 million.

Firefly Aerospace planned to use a Horizontal Integration Facility (HIF) to integrate payloads.

The first test launch and Maiden flight of Firefly Alpha occurred on 3 September 2021 at 01:59 UTC, from a leased pad at Vandenberg Space Force Base in California, and was to fly southwest over the Pacific Ocean. Due to an engine failure caused by a sensor cable disconnect approximately 15 seconds after the launch, the rocket lost control at transonic speeds approximately two and a half minutes after launch that resulted in manual activation of the flight termination system and loss of the vehicle.
The launch vehicle had onboard various payloads as part of Firefly's DREAM mission—including Benchmark Space BSS1, Firefly Capsule 1, and PICOBUS (intending to deploy six PocketQubes), Hiapo, Spinnaker3, and TIS Serenity—which were destroyed. Firefly's experimental Space Utility Vehicle (SUV) third stage was also onboard this flight.

Design 
The Alpha first stage is powered by four Reaver 1 LOX / RP-1 tap-off cycle engines, delivering  of thrust. The second stage is powered by one Lightning 1 LOX / RP-1 engine, delivering  of thrust with a specific impulse (Isp) of 322 seconds. Lightning 1 was test-run for nearly 5 minutes on 15 March 2018 during a long duration test fire on Firefly's Test Stand 1 in Briggs, Texas.

The Alpha airframe uses all carbon-fiber composite material in its construction. Using carbon-fiber makes the rocket more fuel efficient because the use of denser materials like titanium and aluminum would result in a heavier airframe, which would require more fuel to launch.

Intended usage 
Alpha is designed to launch up to 1170 kg of payload to a 200 km low Earth orbit, or up to 745 kg payload to a 500 km Sun-synchronous orbit, suitable for CubeSats and other small payloads. Primary payloads can be integrated by themselves or with a secondary payload, with vehicle capacity for up to 6 CubeSats. This allows Firefly's customers to have a dedicated small-satellite launcher, reducing the issues of ridesharing payloads and secondary payloads. These smaller satellites can have an orbit that is not determined by a larger payload and can launch on their own schedule instead of waiting on the readiness of all other payloads.

Alpha is also intended to be a direct American competitor in the small satellite market to India's Polar Satellite Launch Vehicle (PSLV), as the company believes that PLSV's ride-share capability threatens U.S. domestic launchers in this market.

Launch sites 
Firefly Aerospace is leasing Vandenberg pad SLC-2W to support Firefly Alpha and MLV launches; this launch pad formerly supported Delta, Thor-Agena, and Delta II launch vehicles launches. Additionally, Firefly plans to refurbish and utilize Cape Canaveral SLC-20 for low-inclination launches of Alpha in the future.

Launch history

See also 
 Rocket Lab Electron
 Vega
 Polar Satellite Launch Vehicle
 Small Satellite Launch Vehicle
 Small-lift launch vehicle

References 

Space launch vehicles of the United States